This is a comprehensive list of types of breads of Uruguay:

 Cuernitos
 Galleta de campaña
 Galleta dulce
 Medialuna
 Pan catalán
 Pan flauta
 Pan felipe
 Pan porteño
 Pan marsellés
 Pan tortuga
 Pan de molde de sándwiches
 Pan de rosca
 Pan de rosca de chicharrones
 Pan de viena
 Pebete
 Roseta
 Torta frita

See also
 List of breads
 Pan dulce

References

-
Breads by country
Bread
Uruguay